The Madrilenian Health Service (SERMAS) is the body responsible for the system of public health services in the Community of Madrid.

SERMAS is responsible for both the management and provision of public health care services in the Madrid region, and also the management and implementation of programs for disease prevention, health promotion and rehabilitation.

Hospital network 
The SERMAS network across the region includes the following hospitals:
Ramón y Cajal, La Paz, 12 de Octubre, San Carlos, Niño Jesús, Gómez Ulla, Infanta Leonor, La Princesa, Gregorio Marañón, Dr. Rodríguez Lafora, Carlos III, Virgen de la Torre, Henares, Fundación Alcorcón, Rey Juan Carlos, Móstoles, Fuenlabrada, Severo Ochoa, Sureste, Virgen de la Poveda, Guadarrama and La Fuenfría.

See also 

 Health care in Spain
 Spanish Ministry of Health
 List of hospitals in Spain

References

External links 
 SERMAS website

Public services of Spain
Health care in the Community of Madrid
Administration of the Community of Madrid